Helen Irving (born April 8, 1954) is Professor Emerita at Sydney Law School, University of Sydney, Australia. Irving's research is in constitutional law, employing an historical perspective of the political and social context of Australian constitutional law and citizenship. Research interests include: Australian and comparative constitutional law, gender and constitutionalism, constitutional history and theory, constitutional citizenship.

Between 1997 and 2013, Irving served as a member of the Advisory Council of the National Archives of Australia.

Irving was awarded the Commonwealth of Australia Centenary medal for services to the Centenary of Federation celebrations in 2001 and was a finalist for the NSW Premier's Centenary History Award.

Irving has held international visiting positions in Hong Kong (2004), London (2009), the Fernaund Braudel Senior Fellowship at the European University Institute (2015) and Harvard Chair of Australian Studies at Harvard Law School (2005-2006).

In 2012 Irving received a Faculty of Law Award for Excellence in Teaching. An expert witness on various Commonwealth Parliament committees.

Most recently completing an ARC Discovery Grant project on constitutional citizenship and allegiance. Irving retired in 2020 after 19 years in the Sydney Law School

Irving currently resides in Sydney Australia with her husband, philosopher Stephen Gaukroger.

At the end of 2020, Irving retired from the University of Sydney after 19 years of service. She has been an expert witness for various Commonwealth Parliament committees, and recently became a Member on the Advisory Council, Museum of Democracy, “Democracy DNA” exhibition.

Education 
Irving was awarded a Bachelor of Arts from Melbourne, a Bachelor of Law (Honours) and PhD from University of Sydney. In the interim, Irving completed a Masters of Philosophy at University of Cambridge, England.

Contributions outside academia 
By invitation of United Nations Development Program (UNDP), Irving co-authored a report (alongside Professor Vivien Hart) on gender equality and constitution-making for Iraq in 2003. She contributed by invitation to UN Women workshops on women and constitutional design in New York (2015) and Santiago (2016), the latter as a joint UN Women and Chilean government initiative on Chilean constitutional reform. She has also advised international organisations on constitutional design and gender equality, including on the development of a practical guide to constitution-making for women in countries embarking on constitutional reform.

Irving has written over 50 opinion pieces for newspapers and journals on constitutional history and citizenship, in particular during the years leading to the centenary of federation, the republic debate, and the debate on the proposed adoption of a national Human Rights Act, and most recently on citizenship.

Awards 
 2015 Fernand Braudel Visiting Fellow, the European University Institute
 2012 University of Sydney, Law School Award for Excellence in Teaching
 2005–2006, Harvard Chair of Australian Studies
 2003, Centenary Medal
 1995, Australian Political Science Association, Women and Politics essay prize
 2001, Finalist, NSW Premier's Centenary History Award, for Irving (ed), The Centenary Companion to Australian Federation (CUP 1999)
 1998, Honourable mention, Centre for Australian Cultural Studies Book Award, for To Constitute a Nation (CUP 1997)
 1996, Manning Clark essay prize, Evatt Foundation
 1995, Women and Politics essay prize, Australian Association of Political Science.

Honours 
 2015 Elected Fellow of the Royal Society of New South Wales
 2014 Elected Fellow of the Australian Academy of Law
 2013 Elected Fellow of the Academy of Social Sciences in Australia
 2008, Delegate, Prime Minister's 2020 Summit

Bibliography 

 Irving, H. (1997). To Constitute a Nation: A Cultural History of Australia's Constitution - 1997. United Kingdom: Cambridge University Press.
 Irving, H. (1999). To Constitute a Nation: A Cultural History of Australia's Constitution. United Kingdom: Cambridge University Press.
 Irving, H. (2004). Five Things To Know About The Australian Constitution. United Kingdom: Cambridge University Press.
 Irving, H. (2008). Gender and the Constitution: Equity and Agency in Comparative Constitutional Design. New York: Cambridge University Press.
 
 Ross, S., Irving, H., Klug, H. (2014). Comparative Constitutional Law: A Contextual Approach. United States: LexisNexis.
 Irving, H. (2016). Citizenship, Alienage, and the Modern Constitutional State: A Gendered History. Cambridge: Cambridge University Press.

External sources 
Speech by Helen Irving- Launch of the Henry Parkes Foundation, NSW Parliament House, 4 June 1999
Speech by Federal Arts Minister, Peter Mcgaruan - Launch Irving's The Centenary Companion to Australian Federation, 1 November 1999
Helen Irving on Mary Wollstonecraft and the Enlightenment via YouTube

References 

1954 births
Living people
Recipients of the Centenary Medal
Academic staff of the University of Sydney
20th-century Australian lawyers
Australian women lawyers
Fellows of the Royal Society of New South Wales
Fellows of the Academy of the Social Sciences in Australia